List of universities in Ireland may refer to:

List of higher education institutions in the Republic of Ireland
List of universities in Northern Ireland